Doug Sam (born 18 September 1960, Australia) is a retired Australian professional boxer. He lives in Townsville, Australia.

He won the silver medal in the Men's Middleweight at the 1982 Commonwealth Games.

Sam's biggest fight of his career was in 1987 when he fought for the IBF World super middleweight title against South Korean Park Chong-pal. Sam had his last bout in 2000 against New Zealander Ken Suavine, winning his last belt for the Queensland State cruiserweight title. Sam is the father to boxer Hunter Sam.

Professional boxing titles
Australian National Boxing Federation
Australian super middleweight title (167Ibs)
World Boxing Council  
OPBF light heavyweight title (174Ibs)
Australian Queensland State
Australia - Queensland State cruiserweight title (187¾Ibs)

Professional boxing record

References

External links

1960 births
Living people
Australian male boxers
Super-middleweight boxers
Commonwealth Games medallists in boxing
Commonwealth Games silver medallists for Australia
Boxers at the 1982 Commonwealth Games
Medallists at the 1982 Commonwealth Games